This is a recap of the Carolina RailHawks 2009 season.  The RailHawks are an American soccer team which played their third season in the USL First Division in 2009.

Players

Current roster
As of July 26, 2009

Transfers:
 OUT: Brian Levey, released (7/3/2008)
 IN: Gregory Richardson, free agent (7/9/2009); Greg Shields, free agent (7/17/2009)

Staff
  Martin Rennie - Coach
  Brian Irvine - Assistant Coach
  Richard Huxford - Assistant Coach
  Paul Coleman - Equipment Manager
  Lizy Coleman - Head Trainer
  Ginny Williams - Assistant Trainer
  Amy Arundale - Student Trainer
  Jonathan Chappell - Physician
  Todd Staker - Chiropractor

Schedule

^ Televised nationally on Fox Soccer Channel

^^ Southern Derby fixtures

^^^ U.S. Open Cup fixtures

See also 

North Carolina FC seasons
Carolina Railhawks Fc
Car
Carolina RailHawks FC